Salim (also spelled Saleem or Salem or Selim, strictly transliterated as ) is a name of Arabic origin meaning "safe" or "undamaged". Related names are Selima, Salima, Saleemah, and Salma.

When transliterated, the name Salem can become indistinguishable in English, as the spelling Salim is also used, though with a long a and a short i sounds.

Surname
 Ali Saleem (born 1979), Pakistani television host
 Ali Selim, American film director
 Aliyah Saleem (born 1989), British ex-Muslim and human rights activist
 Ezzedine Salim (1943–2004), Iraqi politician
 Huner Saleem (born 1964), Iraqi-Kurdish film director
 Mai Selim (born 1983), Jordanian singer
 Malek Saleem (born 1985), Qatari professional basketball player
 Naziha Salim (1927–2008), Iraqi artist
 Saleh Saleem (born 1953), Israeli politician
 Saleh Selim (1930–2002), Egyptian footballer and actor
 Shakir Mustafa Salim (1919–1985), Iraqi anthropologist
 Sudono Salim (1916–2012) Chinese Indonesian businessman

Given name

Saleem
 Saleem (playwright), Palestinian-American playwright, actor and dancer
 Saleem Akhtar (1930–2004), Pakistani cricketer
 Saleem Elahi (born 1976), Pakistani cricketer
 Saleem Haddad, (born 1983), author and aid worker of Iraqi-German and Palestinian-Lebanese descent
 Saleem Jaffar (born 1962), Pakistani cricketer
 Saleem Malik (born 1963), Pakistani cricketer
 Saleem Mohammed (born 1968), English cricketer
 Saleem Rasheed (born 1981), American and Canadian football linebacker and free agent
 Saleem Raza (cricketer) (born 1964), Pakistani cricketer

Salim
 Salim (poet) (1800–1866), Kurdish poet
 Salim Abanoz (born 1969), Turkish judoka
 Salim Ali (1896–1987), Indian ornithologist
 Salim Arrache (born 1982), Algerian footballer
 Salim Barakat (born 1951), Kurdish-Syrian novelist and poet
 Salim Cissé (born 1992), Guinean footballer 
 Salim Durani (born 1934), Indian cricketer
 Salim Ghouse (1952–2022), Indian actor, theater director and martial artist
 Salim Grant (born 1977), film, voice and mascot actor
 Salim Haidar (1911–1980), Lebanese politician
 Salim Hamdan (born 1968), convicted terrorist of Yemeni descent detained Guantanamo Bay Camp
 Salim Nuruddin Jahangir (1569–1627), Mughal emperor, also known as Prince Salim
 Salim Jreissati (born 1952), Lebanese jurist and politician
 Salim Kerkar (born 1987), French-Algerian footballer
 Salim Khan (born 1935), Indian scriptwriter
 Salim Mehajer (born 1986), Lebanese-Australian convicted criminal and former politician
 Salim Moin (1961–2020), football coach 
 Salim Ahmed Salim (born 1942), Tanzanian diplomat
 Salim Sayegh, Lebanese academic and politician
 Salim Sdiri (born 1978), French long jumper of Tunisian descent
 Salim Shahed (born 1970), Bangladeshi cricket referee and former cricketer
 Salim Tuama (born 1979), Arab Israeli soccer player
 Salim Turky (born 1963), Tanzanian politician 
 Salim Yasin (1937–2016), Syrian politician

Selim
 Selim I (1465–1520), Ottoman sultan
 Selim II (1524–1574), Ottoman sultan
 Selim III (1761–1808), Ottoman sultan
 Selim I Giray (1631–1704), Crimean khan
 Selim Aga (1826–1875), Sudanese slave
 Selim Al Deen (1949–2008), Bangladeshi playwright and theatre artist
 Selim Benachour (born 1981), Tunisian football player
 Selim Bouadla (born 1988), French-Algerian football player 
 Selim Deringil (born 1951), Turkish academic
 Selim Ekbom (1807–1886), Finnish politician
 Selim Franklin (1814–1884), American pioneer
 Selim Giray (born 1970), Turkish-born American violinist
 Selim Gökdemir (born 1960), Turkish businessman
 Selim Hassan (1887–1961), Egyptian egyptologist
 Selim Lemström (1838–1903), Finnish scientist
 Selim Palmgren (1878–1951), Finnish composer, pianist, conductor
 Selim Sadak (born 1954), Turkish politician
 Selim Sahab (born 1941), Egyptian musician
 Selim Sarper (1899–1968), Turkish diplomat and politician
 Selim Sesler (1957–2014), Turkish clarinet virtuoso of Romani heritage
 Selim Sırrı Tarcan (1874–1957), Turkish educator, sports official and politician
 Selim E. Woodworth (1815–1871), American Navy officer
 Selim Mouzannar (born 1963), Lebanese jeweler and civic activist

See also
Salem (name)
Salim (disambiguation)
Saleem Ali (disambiguation)

Arabic masculine given names
Bosniak masculine given names
Bosnian masculine given names
Turkish masculine given names